Barrik Van Winkle is an American linguistic and legal anthropologist who has done research on the language and culture of the Washoe Nation and on gang violence in the United States.

He received a B.A. from the University of Chicago, where he studied with Raymond D. Fogelson, and an M.A. from the University of Nevada, Reno, where he studied with Warren D'Azevedo and William Jacobsen.

His publications include Scott H. Decker and Barrik Van Winkle, Life in the Gang: Families, Friends, and Violence (Cambridge University Press, 1996), which won an Outstanding Book Award from the Academy of Criminal Justice Science.  His articles on the Washoe are published in Social Analysis, Cultural Anthropology, and New Perspectives on Native North America: Cultures, Histories, and Representations.

References

Sergei Kan and Pauline Turner Strong, eds. (2006) New Perspectives on Native North America: Cultures, Histories, and Representations.  University of Nebraska Press.

Year of birth missing (living people)
Living people
American anthropologists
American anthropology writers
American male non-fiction writers
University of Chicago alumni
University of Nevada, Reno alumni